Vaiden, also known as Cunningham, is an unincorporated community in Perry County, Alabama, United States.

History
A post office operated under the name Vaiden from 1900 to 1906. Vaiden is home to Vaiden Field, a public-use airport owned and operated by the Perry County Airport and Industrial Authority. Vaiden Field was built as an auxiliary practice airstrip for Craig Air Force Base in Selma.

Two types of clay and loam, known as Vaiden clay and Vaiden fine sandy loam, are found in the area.

References

Unincorporated communities in Perry County, Alabama
Unincorporated communities in Alabama